Raúl Diago Izquierdo (born August 1, 1967 in Matanzas) is a retired volleyball player from Cuba. A three-time Olympian (1992, 1996 and 2000) he was honoured Best Setter at the 1998 FIVB Men's World Championship in Japan, where Cuba finished in third place.

Honours
 1991 FIVB World League — 2nd place
 1992 Summer Olympics — 4th place
 1994 FIVB World League — 2nd place
 1995 FIVB World League — 3rd place
 1995 Pan American Games — 3rd place
 1996 Summer Olympics — 6th place
 1997 FIVB World League — 2nd place
 1998 FIVB World League — 1st place
 1998 Central American and Caribbean Games — 1st place
 1998 World Championship — 3rd place
 1999 FIVB World League — 2nd place
 2000 Summer Olympics — 7th place

Individual awards
 1992 FIVB World League "Best Setter"

References

External links
 

1967 births
Living people
Cuban men's volleyball players
Volleyball players at the 1992 Summer Olympics
Volleyball players at the 1996 Summer Olympics
Volleyball players at the 2000 Summer Olympics
Olympic volleyball players of Cuba
Pan American Games medalists in volleyball
Pan American Games gold medalists for Cuba
Pan American Games silver medalists for Cuba
Pan American Games bronze medalists for Cuba
Medalists at the 1987 Pan American Games
Medalists at the 1991 Pan American Games
Medalists at the 1995 Pan American Games
Medalists at the 1999 Pan American Games
20th-century Cuban people